Roger Morris (28 January 1727 – 13 September 1794) was a colonel in the British Army who fought in the French and Indian War.  He was married to Mary Philipse, middle daughter of Frederick Philipse, second Lord of the Philipsburg Manor, and a possible love interest of George Washington.  She owned a one-third share of the Philipse Patent, a vast landed estate on the Hudson River which later became Putnam County, New York.

Following their marriage Morris had a large country estate named Mount Morris (today the Morris-Jumel Mansion) built in northern Manhattan between the Hudson and Harlem rivers in what is now Washington Heights.

Life and career

Morris was born in England on 28 January 1727, the third son of Roger Morris of Netherby, in the North Riding of Yorkshire, and Mary Jackson, the fourth daughter of Sir Peter Jackson.

On 13 September 1745, he obtained a commission in the 48th Regiment of Foot. The regiment served at Falkirk and Culloden, and in Flanders. Morris came to America with General Edward Braddock and served as his aide-de-camp. He was wounded during Braddock's Defeat in 1755 near Fort Duquesne in western Pennsylvania.

Transferred to the 35th Regiment of Foot in 1758, Morris served in Fort Frederick in Nova Scotia; he led the Cape Sable Campaign against the Acadians. Morris joined the Louisbourg Grenadiers, a special corps made up of the Grenadiers of the 22nd, 40th and 45th Regiments, during General James Wolfe's invasion of French Quebec where he participated in the Battle of the Plains of Abraham on 13 September 1759.  During the siege of Louisbourg, Grenadiers suffered a loss of fifty-five killed and wounded. In May 1760, Morris was promoted to lieutenant-colonel of the 47th Regiment of Foot shortly after the Battle of Sainte-Foy, and participated in General Jeffery Amherst's assault and capture of Montreal on 8 September 1760 ending French rule in North America.

Morris retired from the British army in 1764 and settled in New York City on the southeast corner of Whitehall and Stone streets with his American wife, Mary Philipse, nicknamed Charming Polly, whom he had married in 1758. Middle daughter of Frederick Philipse, second Lord of the Philipsburg Manor, she had been a possible love interest of George Washington, and owned a one-third share of the Philipse Patent, a vast landed estate on the Hudson River which later became Putnam County, New York.

Before wedding, a prenuptial agreement was composed that shared a life lease of the estate between husband and wife, transferred after their death to children. The Morrises became pillars of the local establishment since Roger Morris was appointed on the Governor's Council of the Province of New York. The following year after his marriage, Morris had a large country estate named Mount Morris (today the Morris-Jumel Mansion) built in northern Manhattan between the Hudson and Harlem rivers in what is now the Washington Heights neighborhood. Situated on Coogan's Bluff, its vista included lower Manhattan, the Hudson and its Palisades, the Bronx, Westchester, the Long Island Sound and the Harlem River.

American Revolution
Morris and his family lived in Mount Morris from 1765 until 1775, when the American Revolution began. A Loyalist, Morris went to England at the start of the war, while his wife and family stayed at the family seat, Philipse Manor Hall, in Yonkers. Between 14 September – 20 October 1776, General George Washington used the Morris mansion as his temporary headquarters. It later served as the headquarters of British Lieutenant General Sir Henry Clinton, and the Hessian commander Baron Wilhelm von Knyphausen.

Morris returned to New York in 1777, after the city had been captured by the British, and became the Inspector of the Claims of Refugees in the rank of provincial colonel serving until 1783; he and his family left for England after the British defeat in the Revolution. In 1779, estates of 58 prominent Loyalists, including the Morris home and Mary's share of the Philipse Patent, were confiscated by the Commissioners of Forfeiture according to the Attainder Act of 1779 passed by the Third Session of the New York Legislature on 22 October 1779. These were later sold by auction along with Morris's plate and furniture without compensation despite assurance of restitution in the 1783 Treaty of Paris that Revolutionary representatives had signed with the British. As many citizens of New York, however, still harbored strong resentment against the loyalists, the Provincial Congress effectively nullified that article of the Treaty of Paris of 1783 by an act of 12 May 1784.

After the war
It was subsequently shown in court that by prenuptial agreement the Morris share of the Philipse Patent was vested in their children and had not been reached by the bill of attainder. However, a gambit by millionaire John Jacob Astor provided something of a windfall for the Philipse-Morris heirs, but failed to bring him its desired long term rental income. In 1809 he bought the interest of the heirs of Morris for this property for £20,000 sterling and brought suit against the State. After Mary Philipse Morris died in 1825 Astor attempted to collect rents on the lands, but intermediate owners who had previously purchased lands from the NY Commission of Forfeiture refused to pay and Astor tried to evict them. A compromise was reached in 1828 when NY State agreed to compensate Astor for the reversionary rights, which, with costs, amounted to $561,500 when paid in 1832.

Morris died in York, England on 13 September 1794, at age 77. His wife died in York at the age of 96. A monument is erected over their graves at St Saviour's Church there.

Family
Morris had two sons and two daughters by the marriage. The eldest son, Amherst Morris, entered the Royal Navy, and was first lieutenant of the frigate Nymphe, serving under Captain Sir Edward Pellew (later Viscount Exmouth), in her famous action with the French frigate La Cleopatre. He died in 1802.

The other son, Henry Gage Morris, also saw much service in the Royal Navy, and rose to the rank of rear-admiral. He afterwards resided at York and at Beverley, England. He died at Beverley in 1852, and was buried in Beverley Minster. He was father of Francis Orpen Morris the naturalist.

References
Explanatory notes

Citations

Bibliography

Further reading
 Shelton, W H. The Jumel Mansion: Being a Full History of the House on Harlem Heights Built by Roger Morris Before the Revolution. Together with Some Account of Its More Notable Occupants. Boston & New York: Houghton Mifflin Co, 1916.

External links

 Morris Mansion - New York Freedom Trail

1727 births
1794 deaths
35th Regiment of Foot officers
47th Regiment of Foot officers
48th Regiment of Foot officers
British Army personnel of the French and Indian War
Philipse family